Harold James "Dribbler" Hawke (26 August 1909 – 16 June 1995) was an Australian rules footballer who played with North Adelaide in the South Australian National Football League (SANFL).

Hawke was a centre half forward and first played with North Adelaide in the 1927 season. The next year he moved to a farm on the Yorke Peninsula to work and over the coming years only played for North Adelaide on occasions, such as playing finals football in 1930 and 1931. He managed a full season in 1937 and ended up winning the Magarey Medal. Despite playing in eleven different seasons he finished his SANFL career with just 70 games, as well as representing South Australia at two interstate carnivals. He is a half forward flanker in North Adelaide's official Team of the Century.

He later served in the 13th Field Regiment of the Australian Army during World War II.

References

External links

Magarey Medal winners
North Adelaide Football Club players
Australian rules footballers from South Australia
Australian Army personnel of World War II
1909 births
1995 deaths
Australian Army soldiers